The rudl or rull is a western Norwegian couples' folk dance in  or  related to the Swedish snoa.

References

Norwegian folk dances
Norwegian folk music
Dance in Norway